Western Illinois University (WIU) is a public university in Macomb, Illinois. It was founded in 1899 as Western Illinois State Normal School. As the normal school grew, it became Western Illinois State Teachers College.

History

Western Illinois University was founded in 1899. The land for the university was donated to the state of Illinois by Macomb's Freemasons (Illinois Lodge #17). Macomb was in direct competition with Quincy, Illinois, and other candidates as the site for a "western" university. The Illinois legislature selected Macomb as the location. University administrators uncovered evidence of the Freemasons' efforts on Macomb's behalf when they opened Sherman Hall's (the administration building) cornerstone during their centennial celebrations.

The university's name has changed twice since its foundation as the Western Illinois State Normal School in 1899: the school was first renamed Western Illinois State Teachers College in 1921 and then to Western Illinois University in 1967.

Sherman Hall served as the university's primary facility for many years, but as the university and its programs expanded, a need surfaced for further expansion. Sherman Hall is listed on the National Register of Historic Places. Western's presence in the Quad Cities spans more than 40 years. In Fall 1960, the university offered its first undergraduate course in the Quad Cities.

In 2016 and 2017, WIU saw a major downsizing and exodus of faculty and staff as a consequence of massive state budget cuts and declining undergraduate enrollment.

Academics
Western Illinois University is composed of four academic colleges: Arts & Sciences, Business & Technology, Education & Human Services, and Fine Arts & Communication, in addition to an Honors College and the School of Extended Studies, which includes nontraditional programs. In 2023, U.S. News & World Report ranked the university #39 (tie) out of 167 Regional Universities Midwest and, as a Midwest Regional University, #17 in Best Colleges for Veterans (tie), #51 in Best Value Schools, #38 in Top Performers on Social Mobility (tie), and #9 in Top Public Schools (tie).

The university offers 69 undergraduate majors, over 51 bachelor's degree programs and 13 pre-professional degrees at the undergraduate level. At the graduate level, 42 degree and certificate programs are offered. 95% of all courses are taught by full-time faculty. The university offers a Doctorate of Education in Educational Leadership (Ed. D.), which was established in 2005.

Western's Cost Guarantee Plan is a four-year fixed rate for tuition, fees, room and board that remains in place as long as students are continuously enrolled. Western was one of the first institutions in America, and the first state university in Illinois, to offer the guarantee. WIU's program served as a model for all other Illinois state universities through the state's "Truth in Tuition" program. Western Illinois also offers the Cost Guarantee for graduate students enrolled in a degree program, as well as to transfer students earning an associate degree. Those students who transfer to WIU the following semester upon completing their associate degree will receive the previous year's cost guarantee rates.

Library system
Four libraries make up the WIU Libraries system. Completed in November 1975, Memorial Library (renamed and rededicated The Leslie F. Malpass Library in 2001) is the main branch of the library system. Designed by Gyo Obata, Malpass Library stands at six levels high and 222,000 square feet. Other WIU libraries include the Music Library, Physical Sciences Library, Curriculum Library, and the WIU-Quad Cities Library (Moline, Illinois) that was opened in the late 1990s to support WIU's growing presence in the Quad Cities.

Western Illinois University Libraries house several archives and special collections that aid in documenting the history of the west-central Illinois region. The libraries are the home for the Center for Hancock County History, the Center for Icarian Studies, the Civil War Collection (documenting the western Illinois experience in the war), the Decker Press Collection and the Mormon Collection.

Centennial Honors College
Western Illinois University is home to the Centennial Honors College, which was founded in 1983 in order to attract more adept students as freshmen, as well as an avenue by which the most talented students at Western Illinois could distinguish themselves from other students at the university. Accordingly, the GPA admissions standard for the Centennial Honors College is nearly a full grade point higher (0.9) than the minimum GPA of any other college at the university. Honors students complete a series of honors courses and projects and are also eligible for exclusive scholarships.

Western Illinois University Quad Cities

Western Illinois University Quad Cities (WIU-QC) is located in the Quad Cities metropolitan area, a region of four cities in northwest Illinois and Southeastern Iowa, and is located along the Mississippi River in Moline, Illinois. WIU-QC was previously an upper-division commuter site located on John Deere Road in Moline, Illinois.  The branch began a move to the Moline riverfront in 2012, and has expanded to serve all levels of the college experience, from the freshman year to professional development.  WIU-QC offers classes at the undergraduate, graduate, doctoral, and post-baccalaureate levels.

Riverfront Hall, built in 2012 on the site of the former John Deere Tech Center, houses the College of Business and Technology, including the School of Engineering formerly located in the Caxton Building in downtown Moline. In 2014, the Quad Cities Complex was added, three connected buildings which house the Colleges of Arts and Sciences, Education and Human Services, and Fine Arts and Communications, as well as the library, student services, and administration.

Student life

Media
The Western Courier is the school newspaper at Western Illinois University. It is published each Monday, Wednesday and Friday during the academic year, excluding holidays and breaks. Summer publication is on Wednesdays only. The Western Courier is the only officially recognized student newspaper on campus and is distributed free at 80 locations throughout the campus (including residence halls) and throughout the Macomb, Illinois business community.

Western Illinois also has a student-run radio station, 88.3 The Dog, WIUS-FM. The radio station can be heard across McDonough County on 88.3 FM, as well as online through their website (883thedog.com) and their mobile apps.

NEWS3 is Western Illinois University's student-produced television newscast, broadcasting and streaming live 30-minute newscasts on Tuesdays and Thursdays at 4 p.m. The newsroom, studio, and control room are housed on the third floor of Sallee Hall.

106.3 FM, WIUM, Tri States Public Radio, is the NPR affiliate on the campus of Western Illinois University.

Fraternity and sorority life
WIU has 5 PHC sororities, 11 IFC fraternities, and 11 UGC organizations.

Fraternal chapters include:
Sigma Chi
Sigma Pi
Delta Tau Delta
Pi Kappa Phi
Omega Psi Phi
Theta Chi
Tau Kappa Epsilon
Alpha Phi Alpha
Alpha Psi Lambda
Alpha Gamma Rho
Alpha Gamma Sigma
Alpha Sigma Phi
Delta Upsilon
Sigma Alpha Epsilon
Kappa Alpha Psi
Sigma Lambda Beta
Lambda Theta Phi

Sororities on campus:

Sigma Lambda Gamma
Sigma Sigma Sigma
Delta Zeta
Phi Sigma Sigma
Chi Omega
Alpha Sigma Alpha
Alpha Kappa Alpha
Lambda Theta Alpha
Gamma Phi Omega
Sigma Gamma Rho

Transportation
Go West Transit provides fare free bus service for students and residents throughout Macomb.

Athletics

Inspired by the surrounding “vast golden prairie strewn with purple coneflowers,” Western Illinois University adopted purple and gold as its official colors in 1902. WIU is the only non-military institution in the nation with permission from the Department of the Navy to use the United States Marine Corps Official seal and mascot, the Bulldog. Colonel Rock and Rocky, are the university mascots representing “The Fighting Leathernecks”. Colonel Rock and Rocky were named after Ray "Rock" Hanson, a former WIU athletic director and former Marine. As of the Fall of 2009 the men's and women's teams were unified under the Leathernecks name. Previously, the women's teams and athletes at the school were known as Westerwinds.

Western Illinois sports teams participate in the NCAA Division I Summit League. Western Illinois football competes in the Division I Football Championship Subdivision in the Missouri Valley Football Conference. Western Illinois University was a member of the Illinois Intercollegiate Athletic Conference from 1914 to 1970.

Campus safety
Western's Office of Public Safety started as Campus Safety and Security in 1956, replacing the security guard era. The department employs 24 full-time officers and operates 24 hours a day, seven days a week from Mowbray Hall on the WIU campus. In addition to routine patrol, OPS dispatches officers to the street on foot and bicycles, as well as in the residence halls nightly. Officers also perform such duties transporting money from campus buildings to local banks; providing security to athletic events and concerts; providing traffic control; providing transportation to the hospital; conducting building safety checks; hosting educational and safety-related programming; and supervising student patrol and emergency medical services on campus.

Notable alumni and faculty

References

External links

 
 Western Illinois Athletics website

 
State universities in Illinois
Public universities and colleges in Illinois
Educational institutions established in 1899
Education in the Quad Cities
Buildings and structures in McDonough County, Illinois
Education in McDonough County, Illinois
Buildings and structures in Rock Island County, Illinois
Education in Rock Island County, Illinois
Tourist attractions in McDonough County, Illinois
Tourist attractions in Rock Island County, Illinois
1899 establishments in Illinois